HMS Cheltenham was a  of the Royal Navy built in 1916. The Racecourse class (also called the Ascot class) comprised 32 paddlewheel coastal minesweeping sloops. The ship was named after Cheltenham Racecourse.

After decommissioning she was sold to John Cashmore Ltd for breaking up and arrived at their Newport Yard in 1927.

References

Racecourse-class minesweepers
Royal Navy ship names
1916 ships